J. J. Johnson (1924–2001) was an American jazz trombonist and composer.

J. J. Johnson may also refer to:
 J. J. Johnson (American football) (born 1974), former American football running back
 J. J. Johnson (UK musician) (born 1951), British drummer
 JJ Johnson (EastEnders), character in the BBC soap opera, EastEnders
 J. J. Johnson (producer), Canadian television producer and writer

See also
 Jay Johnson (disambiguation)
 Johnson & Johnson, an American multinational company
 J. C. Johnson (1896–1981), American pianist and songwriter
 J. J. Johnston (born 1933), American actor
 Joshua J. Johnson (born 1976), American sprinter